"Dancin on Me" is a song by American rappers Jim Jones and Webstar, from their first collaborative effort The Rooftop (2009). The song, released as the lead single from the album, was produced by Remo Green and Webstar. The song features a guest verse from Jones' Dipset cohort Juelz Santana.

Music video
The music video was directed by Jim Jones, Kevin James Custer and James Franck. It premiered as the "New Joint of the Day" on 106 & Park, on June 11, 2009. In the video, Webstar throws a house party while Jones goes to a photo shoot. At the photo shoot there is a parody of the "Single Ladies (Put a Ring on It)" music video performed by Beyoncé. The video was listed at number #94 on BET's notarized top 100 videos.

Charts

References

External links
"Dancin on Me" lyrics

2009 singles
2009 songs
DJ Webstar songs
Jim Jones (rapper) songs
Juelz Santana songs
Songs written by Jim Jones (rapper)
Songs written by Juelz Santana
Songs about dancing
MNRK Music Group singles